Myco (born February 27, 1979 in Shinjuku, Tokyo) is a Japanese singer, voice actress, and radio personality.

She was the vocalist for the band Changin' My Life, which was formed in 2001 and disbanded in 2003. She was the voice actor for the main character of the hit anime Full Moon o Sagashite, Mitsuki Kouyama, and the band did the music for the show.

She has released one full solo album. She was on a hiatus between 2004 and 2007.

On January 12, 2008, she joined a rock band called Quintillion Quiz with Ju-ken (bass) and Masanori Mine (guitar).

Solo discography

Singles

Albums

My-Collage [TOCT-25360] (August 18, 2004)
 "Lily (El viajero blanco y puro)"
 "Da Capo"
 "Hibari"
 
 
 "Maldives"
 "Dear A Friend"
 "Confession"
 
 "Your Song"

References

Living people
1979 births
Japanese voice actresses
Actresses from Tokyo
Musicians from Shinjuku
21st-century Japanese singers
21st-century Japanese women singers